Claude "Ife" Holmes (August 15, 1905 – January 27, 1985) was an American professional basketball player. He played in the National Basketball League for the Fort Wayne General Electrics from 1929 to 1938.

References

1905 births
1985 deaths
American men's basketball players
Basketball players from Indiana
DePauw Tigers men's basketball players
Fort Wayne General Electrics players
Guards (basketball)
People from Huntington County, Indiana